Robert Barnhill Roosevelt, also known as Robert Barnwell Roosevelt (August 7, 1829 – June 14, 1906), was a sportsman, author, and politician who served as a United States representative from New York (1871–1873) and as Minister to the Hague (1888–1889). He was also a member of the Roosevelt family and an uncle of US President Theodore Roosevelt.

Early life
Robert Roosevelt was born in New York City to businessman Cornelius Van Schaack "C.V.S." Roosevelt and Margaret Barnhill. He had three elder brothers, Silas, James, and Cornelius Jr., and two younger brothers, Theodore and William. He was an uncle of President Theodore "T.R." Roosevelt, Jr. and grand-uncle of First Lady Anna Eleanor Roosevelt. As an Oyster Bay Roosevelt, and through his ancestor Cornelius Van Schaack, Jr., he was a descendant of the Dutch American Schuyler family.

Career 
Roosevelt studied law and was admitted to the New York State Bar in 1850. He commenced practice in New York City. During the Civil War he was an active Democrat, and a founder of the  Allotment Commission and the Loyal National League.

His first experience in politics was in the organization of the Citizens' Association at the time of the Tweed Ring administration in New York city. For several years, he edited the organ of the Citizens' Association, the New York Citizen, at first with Charles G. Halpine, and after Halpine's death by himself. He was a founder of the Committee of Seventy, and first vice-president of the Reform Club.

Roosevelt was elected as a Democrat to the 42nd Congress (March 4, 1871 – March 3, 1873). Although the pressure of anti-Tammany Democratic organizations forced Tammany Hall to approve his nomination, he denounced its measures, and did much to contribute to the breaking up of the latter organization.

Roosevelt served as trustee representing the city of New York for the New York and Brooklyn Bridge from 1879 to 1882. He was instrumental in establishing paid fire and health departments in New York City. He was a member of the Board of Aldermen of New York City.

He was appointed by President Grover Cleveland as Minister to The Hague, serving from August 10, 1888, to May 17, 1889. He was treasurer of the Democratic National Committee in 1892. In 1893, President Cleveland appointed him the secretary of the embassy in London in exchange for a $10,000 campaign contribution.

Conservation
Roosevelt was an early angler and conservationist. He organized several clubs to restrain the indiscriminate slaughter of game. He is credited with influencing his nephew, Theodore Roosevelt, to become a conservationist. He founded the New York State Fishery Commission in 1867, and was appointed one of the three fish commissioners. He served as fish commissioner for 20 years, 1868–1888, without a salary. The reports of the commission were prepared chiefly by him, and led to the appointment of similar commissions in other states.

For many years, he served as president of the Fish Culture Association, of an association for the protection of game, of the New York Sportsman's Club, and of the International Association for the Protection of Game. He was a member of the American Association for the Advancement of Science. As a member of the U.S. Congress, he originated the bill to create the United States Fish Commission.

Writer 
Roosevelt was a popular author and a friend of writers such as Oscar Wilde.  He sometimes wrote under the pseudonym Barnwell or Ira Zell. He edited Political Works of Charles G. Halpine, supplying a memoir (1869).

Robert's nephew Theodore Jr. credited him with being the first to scribe the "Br'er Rabbit" stories (which had been passed down orally by slaves), publishing them in Harper's, where they fell flat. This was a good many years before Joel Chandler Harris published the stories in The Atlanta Journal in 1879.

Personal life
Roosevelt was first married to Elizabeth Ellis (1829–1887), a descendant of the Livingston family who was the daughter of John French Ellis (1794–1853) and Eliza Glen Thorn (1796–1855). Together, they were the parents of:

 Margaret Barnhill Roosevelt (1851–1927), who married Augustus Van Horne Kimberly (1845–1927) in 1889.
 John Ellis Roosevelt (1853–1939), who in 1879 married Nannie Mitchell Vance (1860–1912), daughter of Hon. Samuel B. H. Vance, at the recently built St. Nicholas Collegiate Reformed Protestant Dutch Church, Fifth Avenue and 48th Street, in New York City. Vance, who was active in New York State Republican politics, was a manufacturer who served as Acting Mayor of New York City for the month of December 1874.
 Robert Barnhill Roosevelt Jr. (1866–1929) He purchased the Meadowcroft property at Sayville, New York, in 1873 and it was later developed by his son as the John Ellis Roosevelt Estate. It was added to the National Register of Historic Places in 1987.

After the death of his first wife, he married his mistress, Irish immigrant Marion Theresa "Minnie" O'Shea.  Although his children with Minnie were his biological children, they had been born prior to his wedding to Minnie and were known as his stepchildren. They had been listed as having a father named "Robert Francis Fortescue", and maintained the Fortescue name throughout their lives.  Together with Minnie, he was the father of:

 Kenyon Fortescue (1871–1939), who became an attorney.
 Major Granville Roland "Rolly" Fortescue (1875–1952), who married Grace Hubbard Bell (1883–1979), niece of Alexander Graham Bell.
 Maude Fortescue (1880–1961), who married Ernest William Sutton Pickhardt in 1900 and moved to London.  Pickhardt was the son of Manhattan millionaire Ernest W. Pickhardt and the brother of Baroness Irene von Colberg. They divorced before Pickhardt's suicide in 1909.  In 1945, she married Brigadier General Richard L. A. Pennington.

Roosevelt died in Sayville, Suffolk County, N.Y., on June 14, 1906, while his nephew was serving as President of the United States. His remains were interred in Greenwood Cemetery in Brooklyn.  His large estate was left to his family,

Published works
 Superior Fishing; or The Striped Bass, Trout, Black Bass and Bluefish of the Northern States.
 Game Fish of the Northern States and British Provinces. (1862)
 Game Birds of the North (1866)
 Superior Fishing (1866)
 Florida and the Game Water Birds (1868)
 Five Acres Too Much, a satire provoked by Edmund Morris's Ten Acres Enough (1869)
 Progressive Petticoats, a satire on female physicians (1871)
Fish Hatching and Fish Catching (1879)

References

External links
 
 
 

1829 births
1906 deaths
American people of Dutch descent
Writers from Manhattan
19th-century American diplomats
Robert
Schuyler family
Burials at Green-Wood Cemetery
Angling writers
Democratic Party members of the United States House of Representatives from New York (state)
People from Sayville, New York
19th-century American politicians
19th-century American writers
American male writers
Politicians from New York City
19th-century male writers
Democratic National Committee treasurers